Kamigatake Dam is a gravity dam located in Gifu Prefecture in Japan. The dam is used for power production. The catchment area of the dam is 34 km2. The dam impounds about 5  ha of land when full and can store 215 thousand cubic meters of water. The construction of the dam was started on 1934 and completed in 1935.

References

Dams in Gifu Prefecture
1935 establishments in Japan